Reinsdorf is a municipality in the district Zwickau, in Saxony, Germany.

References 

Villages in the Ore Mountains
Zwickau (district)

uz:Reinsdorf